Cut and Run is a 1985 Italian exploitation thriller film directed by Ruggero Deodato, written by Cesare Frugoni and Dardano Sacchetti, and starring Lisa Blount, Leonard Mann, Willie Aames, Richard Lynch and Michael Berryman.

Plot
The film follows a reporter (Lisa Blount) and her cameraman investigating a war in the jungles of South America between drug cartels and the cult-like cannibal army of Colonel Brian Horne (Richard Lynch), a follower of Jim Jones.

Cast 
 Lisa Blount as Fran Hudson
 Leonard Mann as Mark Ludman
 Willie Aames as Tommy Allo
 Richard Lynch as Colonel Brian Horne
 Richard Bright as Bob Allo  
 Michael Berryman as Quecho 
 Eriq La Salle as Fargas
 Valentina Forte as Ana
 John Steiner as Vlado
 Karen Black as Karin 
 Gabriele Tinti as Manuel
 Ted Rusoff as Manuel's voice (uncredited)
 Barbara Magnolfi as Rita
 Luca Barbareschi as Bud

Production
Cut and Run was originally slated to be directed by Wes Craven with the working title Marimba. It was initially going to star Tim McIntire, Dirk Benedict and Christopher Mitchum. The film was produced in two separate versions, a "softer" R-rated cut intended for the North American market, and a "harder" version for theatrical release in Europe. The latter features additional, graphic kill scenes and gore not present in the former. Several key sequences were shot twice, once with a "soft" take, and a second time with a "harder" take.

Release
Cut and Run was released in Italy 8 August 1985. It was released in the United States by New World Pictures on 2 May 1986. After being absent on home video for many years, the film was released on Blu-ray by Code Red, with a new 2K restoration of both the R-rated and Unrated cuts.

See also 
 List of Italian films of 1985

References

Footnotes

Sources

External links
 
 

1985 films
1985 horror films
Italian thriller films
English-language Italian films
Films directed by Ruggero Deodato
Films scored by Claudio Simonetti
Films set in Venezuela
Films shot in Venezuela
1985 thriller films
Cannibal-boom films
1980s English-language films
1980s Italian films